The Forgotten Army  is a BBC Books original novel written by Brian Minchin and based on the long-running British science fiction television series Doctor Who.  It features the Eleventh Doctor and Amy Pond.

Synopsis
A museum exhibition of a mammoth comes to life at the opening of its exhibition and rampages around the museum.
The Doctor and Amy turn up in New York just in time to have a nice pony ride on mammoth and then the mammoth is taken to a zoo, where the Doctor and Amy visit it and realise that whatever is inside doesn't like humans and have been trapped in their mammoth-like space ship for centuries and are now ready to take the people of New York to a mining project in far space, the Doctor is kidnapped and Amy and the finder of the mammoth have to rescue the Doctor from the Vykoids, the policemen is attacked by the Vvykoids and realises how strong they are.
The Doctor lures Amy to him with mind communication and then Amy saves him and the Vykoid leader starts his teleportation of the American people just when the first people are about to walk to the mining project the Doctor and Amy  turn up and trap the Vykoid leader in a pretzel doing so they defeat the Vykoids.
The Doctor sends the Vykoids back to the mining project and dematerializes into the TARDIS.
A pretzel seller watches as the TARDIS dematerialises and materializes, the Doctor comes out and gets 3 pretzels and tells the man that pretzels saved the day today.
The Vykoid leader is in a spaceship and has only 2 words to say about how he got defeated:
"Amy Pond."

See also

Whoniverse

References

External links

The Cloister Library - The Forgotten Army

2010 British novels
2010 science fiction novels
New Series Adventures
Eleventh Doctor novels